Clivina okutanii is a species of ground beetle in the subfamily Scaritinae. It was described by Habu in 1958.

References

okutanii
Beetles described in 1958